The Valea Mare (also: Valea Negrenilor) is a right tributary of the Danube in Romania. It passes through Lake Dunăreni and flows into the Danube near Dunăreni.

References

Rivers of Romania
Rivers of Constanța County